Chok may refer to:

Places 
 Chok State, a former princely state in Kathiawar
 its seat, a village in present Gujarat, western India
 Chok River, a river in western India
 Chok, Iran, a village in Yazd Province, Iran

People 
 Chok people, a society that lived on the Elgeyo escarpment in Kenya
 Raymond Lam (林峯), known as "Chok王"—meaning "the King of Chok"—a Hong Kong actor and singer
 "Chok", song from Raymond Lam's album LF
 A Chinese masculine given name, popular in Singapore:
 Goh Chok Tong (born 1941), second Prime Minister of the Republic of Singapore
 Lionel Chok (21st century), Singaporean film-maker and director
 Bong Kee Chok (born 1937), politician
 Chok Sukkaew (born 1987), Thai footballer
 Elvie Chok (1924–2015), Hong Kong international lawn and indoor bowler
 Ming Tung Chok, former CEO of Soyo Group
 Philip Chok, Hong Kong international lawn and indoor bowler
 Vera Chok, London-based actor and writer

Other 
  (擢樣), a popular term in Hong Kong, meaning "to forcefully make oneself look more handsome"
 CHOK, a Canadian radio station

See also 
 
 Chock (disambiguation)